Diplomacy (German and French: Diplomatie) is a 2014 Franco-German historical drama film directed by Volker Schlöndorff and adapted from the play Diplomatie by Cyril Gély. Set in Paris in 1944, it offers an imagined account of the efforts by the Swedish diplomat Raoul Nordling to avert the destruction of the city by the German general Dietrich von Choltitz. The film premiered at the 64th Berlin International Film Festival on 12 February 2014. It was also screened at the Telluride Film Festival in August 2014. It won the César Award for Best Adaptation at the 40th César Awards.

Plot summary 
As the Allied Forces move toward Paris, Adolf Hitler commands General Dietrich von Choltitz to destroy the city. Choltitz sends engineering teams to demolish the city's famous landmarks and to overflow the Seine, led by Lieutenant Hegger and advised by a captured Parisian engineer named M. Lanvin. The landmarks targeted include the Eiffel Tower, the Louvre, the Place de la Concorde, Notre Dame Cathedral and Les Invalides.

The Swedish consul, Raoul Nordling, sneaks into the general's office in the Hotel Meurice by means of a secret staircase originally built for a famous courtesan who lived there. He points out the loss of innocent lives if the demolition goes through, and asks the general not to do it. The general is not swayed and is determined to do his duty.

Parisians start to revolt against the German patrols. Fighting fills the streets. Choltitz reveals that through its policy of Sippenhaft, the Nazi government punishes the families of disobedient officers. Nordling tries to downplay its significance, but Choltitz points out that it was enacted right as he was promoted, meaning that Hitler has his eyes on Choltitz.

Nordling offers the chance for the French Resistance to try to evacuate Choltitz's family. He confesses that he would not be able to choose between saving his family and saving Paris, were he in Choltitz's position. However, if he chooses Paris, the world will remember him as a hero. Choltitz relents and cancels the demolition. Lt Hegger tries to trigger it anyway, but is shot by Lanvin.

After the fall of Nazi Germany, Choltitz serves a two-year prison sentence for his earlier actions during the Siege of Sevastopol. Nordling is awarded a medal for his persuasion of Choltitz in Paris, but he passes it over to Choltitz, recognizing him as the real hero.

Cast 
 André Dussollier as Raoul Nordling
 Niels Arestrup as General von Choltitz
 Burghart Klaußner as Hauptmann Werner Ebernach
 Robert Stadlober as Leutnant Bressensdorf
 Charlie Nelson as the concierge
 Jean-Marc Roulot as Jacques Lanvin
 Stefan Wilkening as Unteroffizier Mayer
 Thomas Arnold as Leutnant Hegger

Critical reception
The movie was well received by the critics. Review aggregator Rotten Tomatoes reports that 93% of 45 critics gave the film a positive review, for an average rating of 7.4/10. The site's consensus states that "For filmgoers who value character development and smart dialogue over plot, Diplomacy yields rich, powerfully acted rewards."

Brenda Benthien of kinocritics.com judged the "theatrical tour-de-force" was "a Valentine to Schlöndorff’s beloved Paris".

References

External links 
 
 

2014 films
2010s historical drama films
German films based on plays
French films based on plays
2010s French-language films
2010s German-language films
Films directed by Volker Schlöndorff
German historical drama films
Gaumont Film Company films
Films set in 1944
Films set in Paris
Western Front of World War II films
French historical drama films
Plaion
Films about diplomats
2014 drama films
2010s French films
2010s German films